The Mysterious Island is a novel by Jules Verne, published in 1875. The original edition, published by Hetzel, contains a number of illustrations by Jules Férat. The novel is a crossover sequel to Verne's famous Twenty Thousand Leagues Under the Seas (1870) and In Search of the Castaways (1867–68), though its themes are vastly different from those books. An early draft of the novel, initially rejected by Verne's publisher and wholly reconceived before publication, was titled Shipwrecked Family: Marooned with Uncle Robinson, seen as indicating the influence of the novels Robinson Crusoe and The Swiss Family Robinson. Verne developed a similar theme in his later novel, Godfrey Morgan (French: L'École des Robinsons, 1882).

The chronology of The Mysterious Island is incompatible with that of the original Twenty Thousand Leagues Under the Sea, whose plot begins in 1866, while The Mysterious Island begins during the American Civil War, yet is supposed to happen some years after Twenty Thousand Leagues.

Plot summary
During the American Civil War, five Northern prisoners of war escape during the Siege of Richmond, Virginia, by hijacking a hydrogen-filled observation balloon.  The escapees are Cyrus Smith, a railroad engineer in the Union army (named Cyrus Harding in Kingston's version); his ex-slave and loyal follower Neb (short for Nebuchadnezzar); Bonadventure Pencroff, a sailor (who is addressed only by his surname; in Kingston's translation, he is named Pencroft); his protégé and adopted son Harbert Brown (called Herbert in some translations); and the journalist Gedéon Spilett (Gideon Spilett in English versions). The company is completed by Cyrus's dog "Top".

They name it "Lincoln Island" in honor of Abraham Lincoln. With the knowledge of the brilliant engineer Smith, the five are able to sustain themselves on the island, producing fire, pottery, bricks, nitroglycerin, iron, an electric telegraph, a cave home inside a stony cliff called "Granite House", and even a seaworthy ship, which they name the "Bonadventure".

During their stay on the island, the group endures bad weather and domesticates an orangutan, Jupiter, abbreviated to Jup (or Joop, in Jordan Stump's translation). There is a mystery on the island in the form of an unseen deus ex machina, responsible for Cyrus' survival after falling from the balloon, the mysterious rescue of Top from a dugong, the appearance of a box of equipment (guns and ammunition, tools, etc.), and other seemingly inexplicable occurrences.

The group finds a message in a bottle directing them to rescue a castaway on nearby Tabor Island, who is none other than Tom Ayrton (from In Search of the Castaways). On the return voyage to Lincoln Island, they lose their way in a tempest but are guided back to their course by a mysterious fire beacon.

Ayrton's former companions arrive by chance on Lincoln Island and try to make it into their lair. After some fighting with the protagonists, the pirate ship is mysteriously destroyed by an explosion. Six of the pirates survive and kidnap Ayrton. When the colonists go to look for him, the pirates shoot Harbert, seriously injuring him. Harbert survives, narrowly cheating death. The colonists at first assume Ayrton has been killed, but later they find evidence that he was not instantly killed, leaving his fate uncertain. When the colonists rashly attempt to return to Granite House before Harbert fully recovers, Harbert contracts malaria but is saved by a box of quinine sulfate, which mysteriously appears on the table in Granite House. After Harbert recovers, they attempt to rescue Ayrton and destroy the pirates. They discover Ayrton at the sheepfold, and the pirates dead, without any visible wounds except for a little red spot on each of them.

The island is revealed to be Captain Nemo's hideout, and home port of the Nautilus. Having escaped the Maelstrom at the end of Twenty Thousand Leagues Under the Sea, the Nautilus sailed the oceans of the world until all its crew except Nemo had died. Now an old man, Nemo returned the Nautilus to its secret port within Lincoln Island. Nemo had been the mysterious benefactor of the settlers, providing them with the box of equipment, sending the message revealing Ayrton, planting the torpedo that destroyed the pirate ship, and killing the pirates with an "electric gun". On his death bed, Captain Nemo reveals his true identity as the lost Indian Prince Dakkar, son of a raja of the then-independent territory of Bundelkund and a nephew of the Indian hero Tippu-Sahib. After taking part in the failed Indian Rebellion of 1857, Prince Dakkar escaped to a desert island with twenty of his compatriots and commenced the building of the Nautilus and adopted the new name of "Captain Nemo". Before he dies, Nemo gives them a box of diamonds and pearls as a keepsake. Nemo's final words are "God and my country!" ("Independence!", in Verne's original manuscript). The Nautilus is scuttled and serves as Captain Nemo's tomb.

Afterward, the island's central volcano erupts, destroying the island. Jup the orangutan falls into a crack in the ground and dies. The colonists, forewarned of the eruption by Nemo, find shelter on the last remaining piece of the island above sea level. They are rescued by the ship Duncan, which had come to rescue Ayrton, but was redirected by a message Nemo had previously left on Tabor Island. After they return to the United States they form a new colony in Iowa, financed with Nemo's gifts.

Publication history in English
In the United States the first English printing began in Scribner's Monthly, April 1874, as a serial. In September 1875 Sampson Low, Marston Low, and Searle published the first British edition of Mysterious Island in three volumes entitled Dropped from the Clouds, The Abandoned, and The Secret of the Island (195,000 words).  In November 1875 Scribner's published the American edition of these volumes from the English plates of Sampson Low. The purported translator, W. H. G. Kingston, was a famous author of boys' adventure and sailing stories who had fallen on hard times in the 1870s due to business failures, and so he hired out to Sampson Low as the translator for these volumes. However, it is now known that the translator of Mysterious Island and his other Verne novels was actually his wife, Agnes Kinloch Kingston, who had studied on the continent in her youth. The Kingston translation changes the names of the hero from "Smith" to "Harding"; "Smith" is a very common name in the UK and would have been associated, at that time, with the lower classes. In addition many technical passages were abridged or omitted and the anti-imperialist sentiments of the dying Captain Nemo were purged so as not to offend English readers. This became the standard translation for more than a century.

In 1876 the Stephen W. White translation (175,000 words) appeared first in the columns of The Evening Telegraph of Philadelphia and subsequently as an Evening Telegraph Reprint Book. This translation is more faithful to the original story and restores the death scene of Captain Nemo, but there is still condensation and omission of some sections such as Verne's description of how a sawmill works. In the 20th century two more abridged translations appeared: the Fitzroy Edition (Associated Booksellers, 1959) abridged by I. O. Evans (90,000 words) and Mysterious Island (Bantam, 1970) abridged by Lowell Bair (90,000 words).

Except for the Complete and Unabridged Classics Series CL77 published in 1965 (Airmont Publishing Company, Inc), no other unabridged translations appeared until 2001 when the illustrated version of Sidney Kravitz appeared (Wesleyan University Press) almost simultaneously with the new translation of Jordan Stump published by Random House Modern Library (2001).  Kravitz also translated Shipwrecked Family:  Marooned With Uncle Robinson, published by the North American Jules Verne Society and BearManor Fiction in 2011.

Wrecked On A Reef influence
The 2003 English edition of Wrecked On A Reef (1869), a memoir by French shipwreck survivor François Édouard Raynal, has additional appendices by French scholar Dr Christiane Mortelier who presents a case for the influence of Raynal's book on Verne's The Mysterious Island. The Grafton was wrecked near New Zealand on the Auckland Islands on 3 January 1864, where the crew of five survived for 19 months before obtaining rescue. Wrecked On A Reef, Raynal's memoir of the incident, was very popular at the time of publication, being translated into multiple languages. According to Mortelier, Verne read Raynal's account and loosely based his novel on the true life story of Grafton shipwreck, survival, privation, and ultimate rescue.

Possible connection to Birkenhead and Wirral  

Local teacher John Lamb claimed in 2022 that Verne set parts of his novel in Birkenhead, England

Marathi Translation
The novel has been translated into Marathi by B. R. Bhagwat titled 'निर्जन बेटावरचे धाडसी वीर', which roughly translates as "Brave Fighters on a Deserted Island", and has a cult following in Maharashtra. The novel has also been translated to Malayalam, as Nigoodadweep, translated by Kesavan Nambisan, and into Bengali by Shamsuddin Nawab from Sheba Prokashoni in 1979 and entitled Rahosshor Dip.

Adaptations

Film – English language
 20,000 Leagues Under the Sea (1916 film): This classic American silent feature combines 20,000 Leagues Under the Sea and The Mysterious Island into a single narrative, shifting back and forth between the Nautilus and the island.
 The Mysterious Island (1929 film): loosely based on the back-story given for Captain Nemo in the novel. It is an American part-talking feature short largely in Technicolor, and features talking sequences, sound effects and synchronized music. Filmed as a silent but a talking sequence was added to the beginning and brief talking sequences were integrated into the film. Directed by Lucien Hubbard with Benjamin Christensen and Maurice Tourneur.
 Mysterious Island (1951 serial): a 15-chapter serial directed by Spencer Gordon Bennet.
 Mysterious Island (1961 film): directed by Cy Endfield, also known as Jules Verne's Mysterious Island, featuring special effects from Ray Harryhausen and Herbert Lom as Nemo and a score by Bernard Herrmann.
 Journey 2: The Mysterious Island: a 2012 film loosely based on the novel, directed by Brad Peyton, done as a sequel to an earlier adaptation of Verne's Journey to the Center of the Earth, with Dwayne Johnson taking over the lead role from Brendan Fraser.

Television – English language
 Mysterious Island: a Canadian television series that ran for one season in 1995.
 Mysterious Island (2005): a TV movie featuring Patrick Stewart as Captain Nemo which is only loosely based on the novel. Nominated for a Saturn Award for best TV presentation.
 Jules Verne's Mysterious Island:  A 2012 cinematic adaptation, loosely based on the novel, made for the Syfy Channel.
 The 2019 Netflix television series The I-Land is inspired by Vernes' Mysterious Island, and a paperback copy of Vernes' book is featured in the first episode.
There is also some significance of an adaptation of Captain Nemo and the Mysterious Island in the first arc of the sixth season of Once Upon a Time.

Film and TV – foreign language
 Mysterious Island (1941 film): a USSR production, directed by Eduard Pentslin.
 The 1967 live-action/animated film The Stolen Airship by Czech film maker Karel Zeman is based loosely on Jules Verne's novels Two Years' Vacation and The Mysterious Island.
 La isla misteriosa y el capitán Nemo (L'Île mystérieuse) (1973): directed by Juan Antonio Bardem and Henri Colpi: a TV miniseries featuring Omar Sharif as Captain Nemo.

Audio and music
 The Mysterious Island (1977): A radio adaptation by Ian Martin broadcast on The CBS Radio Mystery Theater.
 The Mysterious Island (2018): a new radio dramatisation by Gregory Evans broadcast on BBC Radio 4 on 5 August 2018 as part of their To the Ends of the Earth drama series.

Boardgames
 The boardgame Mysterious Island were published by The Game Crafter in 2019. The game is a cooperative game, based on the themes of Jules Vernes novel, where all players have to survive and escape an island.

Video games
 The computer game Myst, released 1993, and several locations featured in the game were also inspired by Jules Verne's novel.
 The computer game Return to Mysterious Island (2004) is an adventure game sequel to the story. Its heroine, Mina, is shipwrecked alone on the uncharted island, and finds the body of the previous inhabitant, Captain Nemo (whom she buries). She finally escapes by locating the Nautilus and disabling the island's defenses. On November 25, 2008 Microïds (Anuman Interactive's adventure games label) announced that a sequel was being made, Return to Mysterious Island II. It has been in development by Kheops Studio since April 2008, and was released on PC and Apple iPhone on August 14, 2009.

Literature
 The 2002 novel Captain Nemo: The Fantastic History of a Dark Genius has the events of this novel based on 'real' events that occurred to the real Nemo, Andre, who gave the details of his encounters to Verne.

Theme park
 Mysterious Island is also the name of a themed land at Tokyo DisneySea opened in 2001 and features two attractions based on other Jules Verne novels, 20,000 Leagues Under the Sea and Journey to the Centre of the Earth.

Notes
 In the French original, some characters were named a little differently: Gédéon Spillet, Nabuchodonosor (Nab) and Harbert Brown. In the Kingston translation, the engineer is named Cyrus Harding, and the sailor is named Pencroft.
 There are discrepancies in continuity between this novel and Twenty Thousand Leagues Under the Sea. Although this novel was written in 1874, its events take place from 1865 to 1869. The events of Twenty Thousand Leagues Under the Sea take place between 1867 and 1868. For example, the Captain Nemo appearing in this novel dies at a time when the Captain Nemo in Twenty Thousand Leagues Under the Sea was still alive. There is usually a note in most editions of the book admitting date discrepancies. There are also similar discrepancies with In Search of the Castaways, although, these are not as often pointed out. Another error is that Neb is depicted as Smith's former slave. But since Smith is identified as being from Massachusetts, where slavery was abolished in the 1780s, Neb would never have been a slave.

References

External links

 
 —Stephen W. White translation (1876)
 —W. H. G. Kingston (Mrs. Agnes Kinloch Kingston) translation (1875)
 
 The Mysterious Island—Sidney Kravitz's unedited unabridged translation (2001). The extensive introduction and notes for this volume are at Mysterious Island Introduction.
 The Mysterious Island—Interactive 3D model on CryEngine 1 by Crytek
 
 North American Jules Verne Society
 Link to a map of Lincoln Island with English labels
 The Mysterious Island—BBC Radio 4 drama adaptation

1874 fantasy novels
1874 science fiction novels
1874 French novels
French adventure novels
Novels set during the American Civil War
Castaways in fiction
Crossover novels
Fictional islands
French novels adapted into films
French science fiction novels
Novels about the Indian Rebellion of 1857
Novels about dogs
Novels about survival skills
Novels adapted into comics
French novels adapted into television shows
Novels adapted into video games
Novels by Jules Verne
Novels set in Oceania
Novels set in Virginia
Novels set on fictional islands
Novels about pirates
Richmond, Virginia in fiction
Science fantasy novels
Southern United States in fiction
Novels set on uninhabited islands